Les Walker was a South African Anglican bishop. He was the Bishop of Mpumalanga from 2005 to 2009.

References

21st-century Anglican Church of Southern Africa bishops
Anglican bishops of Mpumalanga
Deans of Pretoria
Living people
Year of birth missing (living people)
Place of birth missing (living people)